Azouz Bechir (born 15 November 1935) is a Tunisian boxer. He competed in the men's light welterweight event at the 1960 Summer Olympics. At the 1960 Summer Olympics, he lost to György Pál of Hungary.

References

1935 births
Living people
Tunisian male boxers
Olympic boxers of Tunisia
Boxers at the 1960 Summer Olympics
Sportspeople from Tunis
Light-welterweight boxers
20th-century Tunisian people